Glom may refer to:
 Great Lakes Outlaw Modifieds, a kind of modified stock car
Glom, a theoretical construct used to distance the presumptions made in classical physics. A fundamental particle with three attributes